The Horn Sonata in E-flat major, Op. 28 is a composition by Franz Danzi published by Breitkopf & Härtel in 1804.

Background

The precise circumstances which led to the composition of the sonata are not known, but it believed to have been inspired by the success of Beethoven's Horn Sonata, Op. 17. While no specified player has been identified, Tatum in his thesis noted that Danzi had composed many works for Carl Türrschmidt, a virtuoso noted for his ability to exploit the low end of the horn's range and that the sonata contains several passages designed to exploit the lower notes of the horn.

Instrumentation

When published as the Sonate pour le Piano-Forte avec accompagnement d'un Cor ou Violoncelle, the horn intended was the natural horn. In modern performances a valve horn is often used.

As the original title suggests, the piano is the dominant instrument, although the horn is not purely restricted to an accompanying role.

Structure

The composition has three movements:

 Adagio - Allegro
 Larghetto
 Allegretto

A standard performance usually lasts 22–23 minutes.

References
Notes

Sources

External links

Compositions by Franz Danzi
Danzi
1804 compositions
Compositions in E-flat major